is a bay on the north coast of Hokkaidō, Japan. It is demarcated by Cape Sōya to the east and Cape Noshappu to the west, with Wakkanai Port to the southwest, and the Sōya Straits to the north. The Koetoi is the main river that flows into the bay.

See also
 Cape Bakkai
 Sōya Hills

References

Wakkanai, Hokkaido
Bays of Japan
Landforms of Hokkaido